Howard Dion Battle (born March 25, 1972) is a former third baseman in Major League Baseball.  Battle spent parts of three seasons in the majors with the Toronto Blue Jays, Philadelphia Phillies and Atlanta Braves.
Battle attended Mercy Cross High School in Biloxi, MS.

External links

Howard Battle at SABR (Baseball BioProject)
Howard Battle at Baseball Almanac
Howard Battle at Baseball Library
Howard Battle at Pura Pelota (Venezuelan Professional Baseball League)

1972 births
Living people
African-American baseball players
Albuquerque Dukes players
American expatriate baseball players in Canada
American expatriate baseball players in Japan
Atlanta Braves players
Baseball players from Philadelphia
Birmingham Barons players
Cardenales de Lara players
Dunedin Blue Jays players
Gary SouthShore RailCats players
Greenville Braves players
Hanshin Tigers players
Knoxville Smokies players
Leones del Caracas players
American expatriate baseball players in Venezuela
Louisville RiverBats players
Major League Baseball third basemen
Medicine Hat Blue Jays players
Myrtle Beach Hurricanes players
Ottawa Lynx players
Philadelphia Phillies players
Richmond Braves players
San Antonio Missions players
Scranton/Wilkes-Barre Red Barons players
Sportspeople from Biloxi, Mississippi
Baseball players from Atlanta
St. Paul Saints players
Syracuse Chiefs players
Toronto Blue Jays players
21st-century African-American sportspeople
20th-century African-American sportspeople